Jozef Weber (born 25 December 1970) is a Czech football manager and a former football player. His playing position was midfielder.

Playing career
Weber started his professional career at MŠK Žilina before moving to Sparta Prague, where he made seven appearances in his first two seasons in the Czechoslovak First League. In the 1990–1991 season he moved to Cheb, where he continued in the Czechoslovak First League until Cheb's relegation in the 1991–92 Czechoslovak First League. Cheb returned to the top flight after a one-season absence and Weber moved to league rivals Drnovice during the 1993–94 season. Weber played in 146 games for Drnovice and scored 14 goals. He is Drnovice's leading player in terms of league appearances made.

Weber left Drnovice in 1999 and moved to Jablonec. In May 2005 he played his 350th top flight match in the Czech Republic, becoming only the 20th player to do so.

During his eight seasons in Jablonec, Weber racked up more than 200 league appearances for the club and scored 10 goals, finally hanging up his boots at the end of the 2006–07 Gambrinus liga. In May 2007 he played his last match at the age of 36 against 1. FC Slovácko.

During his playing career, Weber played in four Czech Cup finals, but was never on the winning team.

Managerial career
Weber started his non-playing career in 2007 as assistant manager in Jablonec, where he worked for more than four years.

Weber was announced as the new manager of Czech First League side Bohemians 1905 in March 2012, replacing Pavel Medynský.

Weber joined MFK Karviná in 2014. He went on to win the Czech Second League in the 2015–16 season. Although Weber guided to Karviná to safety in the 2016–17 Czech First League, he was replaced in November 2017 by the club's sport director, Lubomír Vlk.

Honours 
MFK Karviná
 Czech National Football League: 2015-16

References

External links
 
 Manager Profile at idnes.cz 

1970 births
Living people
People from Bytča
Sportspeople from the Žilina Region
Czech footballers
Czechoslovak footballers
Czech First League players
AC Sparta Prague players
FK Hvězda Cheb players
FK Drnovice players
FK Jablonec players
Czech football managers
Czech First League managers
Bohemians 1905 managers
MFK Karviná managers
FK Mladá Boleslav managers
Association football midfielders
SK Dynamo České Budějovice managers